Twisted Timbers is a steel roller coaster located at Kings Dominion in Doswell, Virginia. It originally opened as a wooden coaster named Hurler in 1994, designed and manufactured by International Coasters, Inc., with a name and layout that matched an identical installation at Carowinds. The ride closed for extensive maintenance in 2015 according to the park, which later teased in 2016 that Hurler was being replaced.

The park contracted  to revamp the aging roller coaster, and in the process, the coaster was redesigned and the wooden track was replaced with steel. The updated track utilizes the company's I-Box track technology, which allows for more aggressive elements and inversions. The roller coaster reemerged as Twisted Timbers on March 24, 2018, featuring three overbanked turns, three inversions, and twenty airtime moments. It ranked third among new rides in 2018 in the annual Golden Ticket Awards from Amusement Today.

History
In 2016, Kings Dominion began to tease that Hurler, a roller coaster which had been closed since 2015, would reopen in 2018. The park also alluded to an upcoming renovation and conversion by Rocky Mountain Construction with the message, "There's really more coming.". On August 16, 2017, Kings Dominion confirmed Hurler would reemerge as Twisted Timbers and open to the public in 2018. The official announcement came in a press release that featured promotional artwork for the ride as well as ride specifications. Just like Storm Chaser at Kentucky Kingdom, the ride would feature a barrel roll drop.

The park scheduled a soft opening on March 22, 2018, for media and members of the enthusiast group American Coaster Enthusiasts, with a second soft opening scheduled the following day for season ticket holders. However, due to inclement weather on March 21, both planned soft openings were held on March 23. The grand opening to the public was held on March 24, 2018.

Construction
When Hurler closed in fall 2015, no signs of renovation were detected. However, on March 25, 2017, Rocky Mountain Construction track was spotted in a storage yard at the park. Amateur drone footage taken four days later revealed that track removal on the old structure had begun. On May 20, new wood and steel supports appeared on the old structure for the first time. Exactly one month later, the park tweeted the first in a series of teasers which set the ride's announcement date for August 16. On August 8, slightly over a week before the formal announcement and three days before ride details leaked onto social media, the ride's lift hill, its highest point, was topped off.

After a winter hiatus, the final track pieces and two custom trains were installed on February 17, 2018, with the signatures of the park's full-time employees placed on the final piece as an "Easter egg". Kings Dominion tested the completed attraction for the first time on February 21. On March 20, four days before the ride's scheduled grand opening, its two trains, one with a blue paint scheme and the other green, tested together.

Theme
The ride takes place in the fictional Hanover Hill Orchard, a rustic apple orchard named after Hanover County, Virginia, where Kings Dominion is located. Signage throughout the queue provides the ride's backstory, stating that in 1950, a mysterious force destroyed the orchard and froze it in time. In the present day, a local businessman has ignored legends surrounding the orchard and reopened it to the public just as it appeared in the 1950s.

Guests are supposed to be touring the abandoned orchard, with the queue line weaving past mangled trees, flipped farm vehicles, and other evidence of the orchard's destruction. The station is themed to a partially destroyed apple shipping warehouse, and the trains resemble weathered 1937 Ford pickup trucks.

Along with the ride's opening in 2018, the surrounding area of the park's Candy Apple Grove section was rethemed to continue the 1950s orchard theme.

Characteristics
Twisted Timbers, previously known as Hurler, is located in the Candy Apple Grove section of Kings Dominion. The roller coaster takes riders to a height of  before entering a barrel roll inversion and dropping them  down the first hill.

Reception
In its debut year, Twisted Timbers placed third in the category of "Best New Ride for 2018" in the annual Golden Ticket Awards publication from Amusement Today, a trade newspaper that focuses on the amusement park industry. Twisted Timbers also ranked 38th on the same publication's list of top 50 steel roller coasters, with Amusement Today complimenting the characteristics of the newly-revamped coaster, saying it "features dramatic maneuvers, an abundance of airtime, inversions and a remarkable smoothness compared to its former life".

Incidents

In June 2018, a woman was hit in the forehead by a mobile phone while riding Twisted Timbers. She was later taken to the hospital and received three stitches.

See also
 Hurler – a roller coaster at sister park Carowinds that shared the same former name
 Steel Vengeance – a roller coaster at Cedar Point that underwent a similar conversion

References

External links

Twisted Timbers at Rocky Mountain Construction

Hybrid roller coasters
Roller coasters operated by Cedar Fair
Roller coasters in Virginia